Jack Johnson may refer to:

Entertainment
 Jack Johnson (musician) (born 1975), American singer-songwriter, director, and surfer
 Jack Johnson, member of the  American pop-rap duo Jack & Jack
 Big Jack Johnson (1940–2011), blues musician
 Jack Johnson (actor) (born 1987), American actor
 Jack Johnson (film), a 1970 documentary film about the boxer
 Jack Johnson (album), a 1971 album by Miles Davis
 Jack Johnson (character), a fictional character in the U.S. TV series Black-ish

Politics
 Jack Johnson (Canadian politician) (1930–2009), politician in Ontario, Canada
 Jack B. Johnson (born 1949), American criminal and former politician
 Jack Johnson (American politician) (born 1968), American politician in Tennessee

Sports

American football
 Jack Johnson (coach) (1892–1927), American football, basketball, and baseball coach
 Jack Johnson (tackle) (1909–1978), American football tackle
 Jack Johnson (defensive back) (1933–2015), American football defensive back

Baseball
 Jack Johnson (second baseman) (1883–1940), African-American baseball player and boxer, nicknamed "Topeka Jack"
 Jack Johnson (outfielder), Negro league baseball player of the 1920s
 Jack Johnson (third baseman), Negro league baseball player of the 1930s

Other sports
 Jack Johnson (boxer) (1878–1946), American boxer, first black heavyweight boxing world champion
 Jack Johnson (English footballer) (1919–1975), English footballer
 Jack Johnson (Australian footballer) (1926–2008), Australian rules footballer for Essendon
 Jack Johnson (sport shooter) (1928-1993), American sport shooter
 Jack Johnson (ice hockey) (born 1987), American professional ice hockey defenseman
 Jack Johnson (rugby league) (born 1996), English rugby league footballer
 Albert Ariel Bedwin Johnson (1914-1996), known as Jack, real tennis world champion
 Jack Johnson (Danish footballer)

Other
 Jack Johnson (posseman) (died 1887), one of Wyatt Earp's posse

See also
John Johnson (disambiguation)

Johnson, Jack